Sultan Ahmad Shah Airport  is an airport that serves Kuantan, a city in the state of Pahang, Malaysia. The airport is located 15 km from the city. In 2009, the airport handled 226,912 passengers on 3,110 flights, though the airport is able to handle over one million passengers annually. In 2008, Taiwan and Tourism Malaysia had co-operated that there were 23 charter flights directly from Taipei to Kuantan Airport, this condition had made Kuantan Sultan Ahmad Shah Airport the first airport in East Coast of Peninsular Malaysia that received international flights. Passengers have to walk from the aircraft to the arrival hall.

Co-located with the airport is RMAF Kuantan, housing 15 Squadron (BAE Hawk) and 17 Squadron (MiG-29) of the Royal Malaysian Air Force.

Airlines and destinations

Traffic and statistics

Passenger facilities
The airport has an outdoor car park, a taxi stand, several small shops, an arrival hall and a departure hall. The front part of the building housing the shops and the check in counters are not air conditioned.

See also

 List of airports in Malaysia

References

External links

Sultan Ahmad Shah Airport, Kuantan at Malaysia Airports Holdings Berhad
 Sultan Ahmad Shah Airport Real Time Flight Schedule

Airports in Pahang
Kuantan
Royal Air Force stations of World War II in British Malaya